The 20th Quebec Cinema Awards ceremony was held on 3 June 2018 in Montreal, to recognize talent and achievement in the Cinema of Quebec. It was hosted by actresses Édith Cochrane and Guylaine Tremblay, who also jointly hosted the 2017 Prix Iris. Formerly known as the Jutra Awards, the Prix Iris name was announced in October 2016. A new category, Best Sound for a Documentary Film, was created for the 2018 event, and the nominees for Best Film was increased from five to seven.

The first winner was announced in spring 2018, with director and screenwriter André Forcier honoured with the Iris Hommage for 50 years of contributions to the province's film industry. Artisans-category awards were given on 29 May. The zombie-themed Ravenous by Robin Aubert won Best Film.

Winners and nominees
Winners and nominees are:

References

Quebec
2017 in Canadian cinema
2018 in Quebec
20